Liberty Township is the name of some places in the U.S. state of Minnesota:
Liberty Township, Beltrami County, Minnesota
Liberty Township, Itasca County, Minnesota
Liberty Township, Polk County, Minnesota

See also 
Liberty Township (disambiguation)

Minnesota township disambiguation pages